Area codes 209 and 350 are telephone area codes in the North American Numbering Plan (NANP) for the U.S. state of California. Their service area includes Stockton, Modesto, Turlock, Merced, Winton, Atwater, Livingston, Manteca, Ripon, Tracy, Lodi, Galt, Sonora, Los Banos, San Andreas, Mariposa, and Yosemite, the northern San Joaquin Valley (part of the Central Valley), and the Sierra Foothills.

Area code 209 was created in an area code split from area code 415 on October 26, 1957. On November 14, 1998, the southern half of this numbering plan area was merged into area code 559 to make more central office prefixes available.

On October 24, 2021, area code 209 was transitioned to ten-digit dialing, despite not being part of an overlay numbering plan at that time, The area code had telephone numbers assigned for the central office code 988. In 2020, 988 was designated nationwide as a dialing code for the 988 Suicide & Crisis Lifeline, which created a conflict for exchanges that still permitted seven-digit dialing.

On November 28, 2022, the 209 numbering plan area was assigned a second area code, 350, to create an all-service overlay, in mitigation of central office prefix exhaustion from increasing code assignments in the area, which was forecast by the NANP Administrator for the fourth quarter of that year. The network preparation period could be expedited since ten-digit dialing was already in effect.

Service area
Counties
Alpine, Amador, Calaveras, El Dorado, Mariposa, Merced, Sacramento, San Joaquin, Stanislaus, Tuolumne

Towns and cities
Acampo, Big Oak Flat, Burson, Ceres, Chinese Camp, Coarsegold, Clements, Columbia, Crows Landing, Dardanelle, Delhi, Denair, El Portal, Empire, Escalon, Farmington, French Camp, Galt, Groveland, Hathaway Pines, Herald, Hickman, Hilmar, Holt, Hornitos, Hughson, Jamestown, Keyes, Kit Carson, La Grange, Lathrop, Le Grand, Linden, Lockeford, Lodi, Long Barn, Manteca, Mi Wuk Village, Midpines, Moccasin, Modesto, Mount Aukum, Mountain House, Newman, Oakdale, Patterson, Pinecrest, Planada, Ripon, River Pines, Riverbank, Salida, Santa Rita Park, Sheep Ranch, Sonora, Soulsbyville, Standard, Stevinson, Stockton, Thornton, Tracy, Tuolumne, Turlock, Twain Harte, Vernalis, Victor, Waterford, Westley, Wilseyville, Woodbridge, and Yosemite National Park

Alpine County
 Kirkwood

Amador County

 Amador City
 Buckhorn
 Buena Vista
 Drytown
 Fiddletown
 Ham's Station
 Ione
 Jackson
 Martell
 Pine Grove
 Pioneer
 Plymouth
 Sutter Creek
 Volcano

Calaveras County

 Altaville
 Angels Camp
 Arnold
 Avery
 Calaveritas
 Campo Seco
 Cave City
 Copperopolis
 Dorrington
 Douglas Flat
 Forest Meadows
 Fourth Crossing
 Glencoe
 Jenny Lind
 Jesus Maria
 Mokelumne Hill
 Mountain Ranch
 Murphys
 Paloma
 Rail Road Flat
 Rancho Calaveras
 San Andreas
 Sandy Gulch
 Vallecito
 Valley Springs
 Wallace
 West Point

Mariposa County

 Bootjack
 Buck Meadows
 Catheys Valley
 Coulterville
 Mariposa
 Wawona
 Yosemite Valley

Merced County

 Atwater
 Ballico
 Cressey
 Delhi
 Dos Palos
 El Nido
 Gustine
 Hilmar
 Le Grand
 Livingston
 Los Banos
 Merced
 Planada
 Santa Nella
 Snelling
 South Dos Palos
 Winton

Sacramento County
 Galt
 Herald

San Joaquin County

 August
 Banta
 Country Club
 Escalon
 Farmington
 French Camp
 Garden Acres
 Kennedy
 Lathrop
 Lincoln Village
 Linden
 Lockeford
 Lodi
 Manteca
 Morada
 Mountain House
 North Woodbridge
 Ripon
 South Woodbridge
 Stockton
 Taft Mosswood
 Tracy
 Victor

Stanislaus County

 Bystrom
 Ceres
 Del Rio
 Denair
 East Oakdale
 Empire
 Grayson
 Hickman
 Hughson
 Keyes
 Knights Ferry
 Modesto
 Newman
 Oakdale
 Patterson
 Riverbank
 Riverdale Park
 Salida
 Shackelford
 Turlock
 Waterford
 West Modesto
 Westley

Tuolumne County

 Bret Harte
 Chinese Camp
 Columbia
 Confidence
 East Sonora
 Groveland-Big Oak Flat
 Jamestown
 Mi-Wuk Village
 Moccasin
 Mono Vista
 Phoenix Lake-Cedar Ridge
 Pine Mountain Lake
 Sonora
 Soulsbyville
 Strawberry
 Tuolumne City
 Twain Harte

See also
 List of California area codes

References

External links

209
Amador County, California
Calaveras County, California
El Dorado County, California
Mariposa County, California
Merced County, California
San Joaquin County, California
Stanislaus County, California
Tuolumne County, California
San Joaquin Valley
Sierra Nevada (United States)
Telecommunications-related introductions in 1958
209